Hans Hummel (17 June 1944 – 6 February 1995) was an Austrian former professional Grand Prix motorcycle road racer. His best year was in 1980 when he finished in third place in the 50cc world championship, behind Eugenio Lazzarini and Stefan Dörflinger.

After his racing career, Hummel became an accomplished engine builder, specializing in two-stroke engines.

References 

1944 births
1995 deaths
50cc World Championship riders
125cc World Championship riders
Austrian motorcycle racers